Yael Kraus (born November 21, 1977) is an Israeli singer-songwriter based in New York City.

Biography
Kraus comes from an artistic family of painters, writers and musicians; the popular singer and songwriter Shmulik Kraus (The High Windows) is her uncle.

Kraus studied traditional Bulgarian singing and classical modern music with avant-garde virtuoso Fred Frith. She's a frequent collaborator with Roy Yarkoni and six other musicians under the art rock act Panic Ensemble performing for the Israel Festival and several European live shows. She collaborated with many Israeli musicians, such as Assaf Amdursky, Yoni Bloch, Ivri Lider and Tzach Drori.

In 2008, she teamed with Noa Goldanski and Michael Frost to record and release Bussa (בוּסה) on NMC Music, an album of bossa nova covers for popular Israeli songs. The same year she also performed the theme song in the TV series On the Fingertips (על קצות האצבעות‎). Her debut solo album Boutique was released in 2010. It was produced by Daniel Koren, New York City based composer and pianist, co-composed mainly with Ben Hendler and was mixed by Tamir Muskat of the Balkan Beat Box.

Discography
Boutique (Jonathan Lipitz Music, 2010)
Bussa (NMC Music, 2008)
Panic Ensemble (Earsay Records, 2008)

References

External links
 Official Website 
 Myspace Page 
 Yael Kraus on Jonathan Lipitz 

Israeli emigrants to the United States
21st-century Israeli women singers
People from Tel Aviv
Living people
1977 births